The Cohors IV Baetica was a cohort of Roman auxiliaries.  It was originally recruited from natives of Hispania Baetica, a Roman province created on 29 BC, after the division of province Hispania Ulterior.

In a bronze inscription dated 51–74 AD, which was found in Bergamo on 1871, it is mentioned a member of the cohors "M(arcus) Sempronius Fuscus praefectus cohortis Baeticae".

See also 
 List of Roman auxiliary regiments

Notes

Military units and formations established in the 1st century BC
Military units and formations of the Roman Empire
Roman Dacia